At the 2013 Jeux de la Francophonie, the judo events were held in Nice, France from 11 to 13 September. A total of 14 events were contested according to gender and weight division.

Medal winners

Men

Women

Medal table

References

2013 Jeux de la Francophonie
Francophonie Games
Judo at the Jeux de la Francophonie
Francophone Games